Wing Ning Tsuen is a village in Wang Chau, Yuen Long District, Hong Kong.

Administration
Wing Ning Tsuen is a recognized village under the New Territories Small House Policy. Wing Ning Tsuen is one of the 37 villages represented within the Ping Shan Rural Committee. For electoral purposes, Wing Ning Tsuen is part of the Ping Shan Central constituency.

See also
 Wang Chau housing controversy

References

External links
 Delineation of area of existing village Wing Ning Tsuen (Ping Shan) for election of resident representative (2019 to 2022)

Villages in Yuen Long District, Hong Kong
Wang Chau (Yuen Long)